Khlevishche is a rural locality (a selo) and the administrative center of Khlevishchensky Rural Settlement, Alexeyevsky District, Belgorod Oblast, Russia. The population was 748 as of 2010. There are 14 streets.

Geography 
Khlevishche is located 20 km southwest of Alexeyevka (the district's administrative centre) by road. Solomakhin is the nearest rural locality.

References 

Rural localities in Alexeyevsky District, Belgorod Oblast
Biryuchensky Uyezd